Nathaniel Smith (1730 – 6 May 1794) was a naval officer, director of the Honourable East India Company and a politician who sat in the House of Commons variously between 1783 and 1794.

Smith was the posthumous son of naval captain Nathaniel Smith of St Giles Cripplegate and his wife Anne Gould, daughter of James Gould. Smith joined the naval service of the Honourable East India Company and was appointed commander of the East-Indiaman Clinton in 1759. In 1765 he transferred to the Lord Camden. After six voyages to India he retired in 1771 with a small fortune. He stood for parliament unsuccessfully at Rochester in 1772 and in 1780.

Smith wrote three pamphlets on the rule of the East India Company in India and two on its shipping problems. He became a director of the company in 1774. In February 1783, Smith was elected Member of Parliament (MP) for Pontefract until he was unseated on petition in April 1783. However he vigorously opposed Fox's India Bill and was consequently elected chairman of the HEIC in November 1783.

In 1784 Smith was elected MP for Rochester and held the seat until 1790. He offered guarded support for Warren Hastings in the debate on his impeachment in 1787. He regained the seat in a by-election in 1792 and held it until his death aged 63 in 1794.

Smith married Hester Dance, daughter of George Dance on 4 December 1784. He provided support for his wife's nephew Nathaniel Dance in his dealings with the East India Company.

References

1794 deaths
1730 births
Members of the Parliament of Great Britain for English constituencies
British MPs 1780–1784
British MPs 1784–1790
Directors of the British East India Company